= Results of the 1882 Canadian federal election =

1882 Canadian federal election

== Results by Province ==
=== British Columbia ===
Results in British Columbia
Party	Seats	Second	Third	Fourth	Fifth	Votes	%	+/-
Conservative	3	0	0	0	0	1,107	38.37	
Unknown	0	2	2	1	1	1,016	35.22	
Liberal–Conservative	3	0	0	0	0	455	15.77	
Liberals	0	1	0	0	0	307	10.64	
Total	6					2,885	100.0	

=== Manitoba ===
Results in Manitoba
Party	Seats	Second	Third	Votes	%	+/-
Liberals	2	0	0	2,561	36.9	
Unknown	0	3	1	2,242	32.31	
Conservative	2	1	0	1,377	19.84	
Liberal–Conservative	1	0	0	760	10.95	
Total	5			6,940	100.0	

=== New Brunswick ===
Results in New Brunswick
Party	Seats	Second	Third	Fourth	Votes	%	+/-
Liberals	7	3	1	0	14,764	38.08	
Conservative	4	3	0	0	9,740	25.12	
Unknown	0	7	1	1	9,073	23.4	
Liberal–Conservative	3	0	0	0	2,700	6.96	
Independent Liberal	1	0	0	0	2,359	6.08	
Independent	1	0	1	0	135	0.35	
Total	16				38,771	100.0	

=== Nova Scotia ===
Results in Nova Scotia
Party	Seats	Second	Third	Fourth	Votes	%	+/-
Liberals	8	6	3	0	21,833	38.73	
Liberal–Conservative	5	2	0	1	14,542	25.8	
Conservative	8	4	0	0	12,945	22.96	
Unknown	0	4	0	0	4,330	7.68	
Independent	0	1	0	0	2,720	4.83	
Total	21				56,370	100.0	

=== Ontario ===
Results in Ontario
Party	Seats	Second	Third	Votes	%	+/-
Liberals	39	13	2	85,797	31.34	
Unknown	0	59	2	81,106	29.62	
Conservative	39	9	0	73,997	27.03	
Liberal–Conservative	14	3	0	26,567	9.7	
Independent	0	3	0	4,517	1.65	
Independent Liberal	0	1	0	1,800	0.66	
Total	92			273,784	100.0	

=== Prince Edward Island ===
Results in Prince Edward Island
Party	Seats	Second	Third	Votes	%	+/-
Liberals	4	1	0	11,856	40.73	
Liberal–Conservative	2	1	0	7,388	25.38	
Conservative	0	1	1	4,974	17.09	
Unknown	0	0	2	4,893	16.81	
Total	6			29,111	100.0	

=== Quebec ===
Results in Quebec
Party	Seats	Second	Third	Fourth	Votes	%	+/-
Conservative	38	5	0	0	39,614	37.35	
Unknown	0	31	3	1	28,518	26.89	
Liberals	12	10	0	0	22,598	21.31	
Liberal–Conservative	12	0	0	0	10,890	10.27	
Independent Liberal	1	0	0	0	1,581	1.49	
Nationalist Conservative	1	0	0	0	1,084	1.02	
Independent Conservative	1	1	0	0	927	0.87	
Independent	0	1	0	0	855	0.81	
Total	65				106,067	100.0	
